The  is an electric multiple unit (EMU) commuter train type operated by the private railway operator Nankai Electric Railway in Japan since 8 October 2015.

Operations
The 8300 series trains are used on Nankai Main Line, Nankai Wakayamakō Line, and Nankai Airport Line commuter services singly or coupled with 12000 series EMUs on Southern Premium limited express services to provide non-reserved accommodation.

Since 22 November 2019, 8300 series trains have been used on Koya Line services. Nankai expects to deploy additional 8300 series trains and replace the entirety of the 6000 series fleet on the Koya Line by 2023.

Formations
, the fleet consists of five four-car sets (8301 to 8305) and six two-car sets (8701 to 8706). Two-car trainsets were also delivered from July 2016.

Four-car sets
The four-car sets are formed as follows, with two motored ("M") cars and two non-powered intermediate trailer ("T") cars.

The motored cars each have one single-arm pantograph.

Two-car sets
The two-car sets are formed as follows, with one motored ("M") car and one non-powered trailer ("T") car.

The motored cars each have two single-arm pantographs.

Interior
Passenger accommodation consists of longitudinal seating with LED lighting used throughout.

History
Details of the new trains were first announced officially by Nankai Electric Railway on 25 March 2015. The first two four-car sets, built by Kinki Sharyo, were delivered in June 2015. The first train entered revenue service on 8 October 2015.

Six two-car sets were delivered from Kinki Sharyo in July and August 2016. These entered revenue service on 12 September 2016.

Fleet history
The individual build details for the fleet are as follows.

Four-car sets

Two-car sets

References

External links

 Official press release (25 March 2015) 

Electric multiple units of Japan
Train-related introductions in 2015
Nankai Electric Railway rolling stock
Kinki Sharyo multiple units
1500 V DC multiple units of Japan